Holland Municipal Stadium was a 5,322-seat American football stadium located in Holland, Michigan.  Built in 1979, Hope College purchased Holland Municipal Stadium from the City of Holland in 2012 and renamed the facility, where the Flying Dutchmen play, Ray & Sue Smith Stadium. Ray & Sue Smith Stadium is also used regularly for high school football, including the hometown team, Holland High School.  The stadium features two concession stands, restrooms, and a press box. It is adjacent to a municipal swimming pool; the stadium shares locker room facilities with the pool.

Hope College built the adjacent Lugers Fieldhouse in 1991. The Flying Dutchmen's locker rooms are located there, as are locker rooms for other sports and a sports medicine center.

It is also used for graduation ceremonies and other special events, including fireworks and the Tulip Time Festival.

External links
Holland Municipal Stadium

College football venues
Sports venues in Michigan
American football venues in Michigan
Sports venues completed in 1979
1979 establishments in Michigan
High school football venues in the United States
Hope Flying Dutchmen football